Cezary Paweł Kasprzak (born 26 March 1961 in Wrocław) is a Polish political and human rights activist, one of the leaders of the Obywatele RP movement , and a professional TV producer. He was an Independent Students' Union, Orange Alternative and Solidarity trade union activist, a close collaborator of Władysław Frasyniuk. He is a founding member of the Consultative Council of Poland created during the October 2020 Polish protests. He is an author of numerous press publications.

References 

1961 births
Living people
Solidarity (Polish trade union) activists
Polish dissidents